Kröv-Bausendorf is a former Verbandsgemeinde ("collective municipality") in the district Bernkastel-Wittlich, in Rhineland-Palatinate, Germany. On 1 July 2014 it merged into the Verbandsgemeinde Traben-Trarbach. Its seat of administration was in the village Kröv, which is situated on the river Moselle, approx. 15 km east of Wittlich.

Kröv-Bausendorf consisted of the following Ortsgemeinden ("local municipalities"):

 Bausendorf 
 Bengel 
 Diefenbach 
 Flußbach
 Hontheim 
 Kinderbeuern 
 Kinheim 
 Kröv
 Reil
 Willwerscheid

Former Verbandsgemeinden in Rhineland-Palatinate